The XPW King of the Deathmatch Championship is one of Xtreme Pro Wrestling's championships. Originally, the championship existed as a trophy that was at stake in the first-ever Baptized in Blood event, which featured a Japanese-style 8-Man King of the Deathmatch tournament.

Background
After The Messiah defeated Supreme for the championship, an actual title belt for the championship would later appear and debut at XPW's Baptized in Blood 2. The Messiah would wind up as the longest reigning champion, holding onto the title for nearly a year, and only being stripped of the title after he was fired from XPW.

The championship was highly contested while XPW was based in the West Coast, as matches would often consist of a plethora of Barbed-Wire, Beds of Nails, Beds of Thumbtacks, Light Bulbs and (occasionally) exploding barbed-wire devices.

My Bloody Valentine 2000 

1. Bed of Nails, Barbed Wire Board & Barbed Wire Table Match
2. Barbed Wire Ladder & Thumbtacks Match
3. Bed of Light Bulbs & Barbed Wire Board Match
4. Beds of Nails, Glass & Barbed Wire Bat Match
5. Beds of Barbed Wire, Thumbtacks & Nails Match
6. Barbed Wire Board & Barbed Wire Bat Match
7. No Rope Barbed Wire, Beds of Everything Match

My Bloody Valentine 2001 

1. Beds of Barbed Wire & Nails Match
2. Beds of Light Tubes/Light Bulbs & Broken Glass Match
3. Bed of Thumbtacks, Barbed Wire Board & Barbed Wire Table Match
4. Bed of Thumbtacks & Barbed Wire Ladder Match
5. Beds of Light Bulbs, Broken Glass & Barbed Wire Board Match
6. Beds of Barbed Wire, Thumbtacks & Nails Match
7. Double Hell, Beds of Thumbtacks, Broken Glass, Light Tubes, Barbed Wire Light Tube Tables, Barbed Wire Ladder & 16-Feet Ladder Match

Baptized In Blood III: Night Of Champions 

1. Barbed Wire Ropes, Beds of Barbed Wire, Nails, Barbed Wire Board, Barbed Wire Ladder & Fans Bring The Weapons Match
2. Barbed Wire Ropes, Beds of Barbed Wire, Nails, Barbed Wire Board, Barbed Wire Ladder & Fans Bring The Weapons Match
3. Barbed Wire Ropes, Beds of Barbed Wire, Nails, Barbed Wire Board, Barbed Wire Ladder & Fans Bring The Weapons Match (this match was supposed to be Steve Rizzono vs. Crimson, but Pogo the Clown interjected himself into the match and pinned Rizzono while Crimson was outside the ring)
4. Barbed Wire Ropes, Beds of Barbed Wire, Nails, Barbed Wire Board, Barbed Wire Ladder & Fans Bring The Weapons Match
5. Barbed Wire Ropes, Beds of Barbed Wire, Nails, Barbed Wire Board, Barbed Wire Ladder & Fans Bring The Weapons Match
6. Barbed Wire Ropes, Beds of Barbed Wire, Nails, Barbed Wire Board, Barbed Wire Ladder & Fans Bring The Weapons Match
7. Barbed Wire Ropes, Beds of Light Tubes, Nails, Barbed Wire Board, Barbed Wire Table, Barbed Wire Ladder, Fans Bring The Weapons & Exploding Ring Scaffold Match

Title history

Combined reigns

See also
IWA King of the Death Match
IWA Mid-South King of the Deathmatch
Combat Zone Wrestling's Tournament of Death

References
 General
 
 
 Specific

External links 
 Xtreme Pro Wrestling King of the Death Match Title Holders at The Accelerator's Wrestling Rollercoaster
 XPW King Of The Death Matches Title History  at Cagematch.net

Xtreme Pro Wrestling championships
Hardcore wrestling championships